The 2002 Beach Soccer World Championships was the eighth edition of the Beach Soccer World Championships, the most prestigious competition in international beach soccer contested by men's national teams until 2005, when the competition was then replaced by the second iteration of a world cup in beach soccer, the better known FIFA Beach Soccer World Cup. It was organised by Brazilian sports agency Koch Tavares (one of the founding partners of Beach Soccer Worldwide).

The tournament continued to change its location, this time being staged for the first time at two venues, in Vitória, (Espírito Santo) and primarily Guarujá, (São Paulo), Brazil. In addition, the number of participating teams was reduced back to eight, as it was during the first three editions.

Brazil narrowly beat defending champions Portugal 6–5 in the final to reclaim the title, winning their seventh crown in eight attempts.

Organisation
The format reverted to how the competition was organised during its founding years of 1995 to 1997. After three years as a twelve team tournament, the number of participants was reduced back to eight as it were originally, competing in two groups of four teams in a round robin format. The top two teams progressed straight to the semi-finals from which point on the championship was played as a knock-out tournament until a winner was crowned with an additional match to determine third place.

The schedule was announced in December 2001. Despite the tournament being held in two locations, in reality only one match, the opening fixture between Brazil and Thailand, was staged in Vitória whilst the other fifteen were held in Guarujá.

Rede Globo broadcast the games on television in Brazil.

Teams

Qualification
European teams gained qualification by finishing in the top three spots of the 2001 Euro Beach Soccer League (EBSL). The winners, runners up and third placed nations in the previous World Championships also gained automatic qualification for their performances a year earlier; reigning champions Portugal had already gained their spot through being runners-up in the EBSL, however runners-up of last years World Cup France, who did not finish in the top three of the ESBL, and third placed Argentina, gained their spots this way.

The other entries received invites.

Entrants
Africa, North America and Oceania were unrepresented.

Asian Zone (1):
1,Inv.

European Zone (4):

South American Zone (2):

Inv.

Hosts:
 (South America)
=

Group stage
Matches are listed as local time in Vitória and Guarujá, (BRST / UTC-2)

Group A

Group B

Knockout stage
January 18 was allocated as a rest day.

Semi-finals

Third place play-off

Final

Winners

Awards

Top goalscorers

9 goals
 Neném
 Madjer
 Nico

8 goals
 Alan

7 goals
 Borghi

5 goals
 Junior Negão
 Benjamin
 Amarelle
 Juninho
 Miguel

4 goals
 Lungkaew
 Jorginho
 Albore
 Gentile

3 goals
 David
 Polsak
 Aquilante
 Hilaire
 Topo
 Hernâni
 Barraca

 Pico
 Khongkeaw

2 goals
 Nico
 Bonora
 Eric Cantona
 Samoun
 Godoy
 Zé Miguel
 Gato
 German

19 others scored 1 goal each

Final standings

References

Sources
RSSSF
Roonba

2002
2002
2002 in beach soccer
2002 in Brazilian football
Sport in Espírito Santo
Sport in São Paulo (state)